Channel 5 (also known as "Channel 5 with Andrew Callaghan" on YouTube) is an American digital media company and web channel, billed as a "digital journalism experience." The show is a spinoff of the group's previous project, All Gas No Brakes, which was itself based on the book of the same name. The channel is run by Andrew Callaghan, Nic Mosher, and Evan Gilbert-Katz and has amassed 2.2 million subscribers as of December 2022. Similar to the format of All Gas No Brakes, the show features gonzo journalism and man on the street interviews as well as longer-form documentary film. The show is primarily broadcast via Patreon with content later added to their YouTube channel. An affiliate channel, Channel 5 Clips, showcases humorous cuts from the longer content.

History 
Following a contract dispute with Doing Things Media over creative control and profit allocation for All Gas No Brakes, Callaghan, Mosher, and Gilbert-Katz ended the business relationship and created Channel 5 in April 2021, launching a Patreon page to support the channel. The team purchased a decommissioned news van and new production equipment and released limited edition merchandise in September 2021.

In December 2022, HBO announced a documentary special about the January 6 United States Capitol attack titled This Place Rules; the special was created by Callaghan and Channel 5 (with production by A24) and released on December 30. Previews from the documentary special were uploaded to the Channel 5 YouTube page.

In early January 2023, shortly after the release of This Place Rules, multiple women accused host Callaghan of sexual misconduct via social media platforms. On January 15, Callaghan responded to the allegations on YouTube and expressed that while some stories about him are "not true,” he apologizes for his behavior and plans to seek professional help.

Personnel 
 Andrew Callaghan – Former host of Quarter Confessions and All Gas No Brakes.
 Nic Mosher – Videographer, skateboarder and skate videographer. Childhood friend of Callaghan.
 Evan Gilbert-Katz – Videographer, childhood friend of Callaghan.

Episodes

Music videos 
In the "Utah Rap Festival" episode of the web show, Callaghan interviewed multiple young rappers. He flew out two teens to professionally record their song "Clap That", with an accompanying music video, which was released on the Channel 5 YouTube channel on January 4, 2022.
 "Clap That" - Rowboat (ft. Lil Xay)

Awards and nominations

References

External links 
 

English-language YouTube channels
YouTube channels launched in 2021
Streamy Award-winning channels, series or shows